CSY may refer to:

 CSY is the ICAO airline designator for Shuangyang General Aviation Company, China
 CSY is the IATA airport code for Cheboksary Airport, Russia
 CSY is the National Rail station code for Coseley railway station, England
 Central Siberian Yupik language, one of the four Yupik languages. It is spoken also on St. Lawrence Island